The Colorado Sun is an online news outlet based in Denver, Colorado.  It launched on September 10, 2018, to provide long-form, in-depth coverage of news from all around Colorado. It was started with two years of funding from blockchain venture capitalists at Civil and from a Kickstarter campaign. The news outlet is now funded by reader support, through memberships, and from sponsorship and grant revenue. The electronic newspaper is based in Denver. It is an associate member of the Associated Press.

History
Ten former employees of The Denver Post started The Colorado Sun in response to multiple layoffs after layoffs prompted by the hedge fund that owns the post, Alden Global Capital. None of the founders of The Sun were laid off from The Post. They left on their own volition.

The Colorado Sun was initially started with a combination of financial and technical support from Civil, a blockchain platform for news organizations to independently found and run newsrooms, and from a Kickstarter campaign that more than doubled its initial goals.  This combination provided The Colorado Sun with two years of initial funding, and a subsequent grant from Wend Ventures in late 2018 provided two years of funding for educational reporting.  The newspaper accepts advertising, and is supported through a combination of memberships, sponsorships, grants and donations.

In May 2021, The Colorado Sun and nonprofit organization The National Trust for Local News became joint owners of 24 local newspapers after acquiring them from the previous owners, Colorado Community Media.

The Colorado Sun's editor is Larry Ryckman. Dana Coffield is the senior editor.

Newsletters
The Colorado Sun generates several newsletters:
 The Sunriser: five-day-a-week newsletter with Colorado headline news
 The Unaffiliated: twice-a-week newsletter covering Colorado politics
 The Outsider: weekly newsletter covering Colorado outdoor recreation
 The Temperature: weekly newsletter covering Colorado health and climate news
 Colorado Sunday: weekly newsletter covering Colorado news and arts and culture
 Mike Littwin: twice-weekly newsletter with commentary on Colorado politics

References

External links 

 Colorado Sun YouTube channel
 The Colorado Sun

Newspapers published in Colorado
Non-profit organizations based in Colorado
Blockchain entities